, located in Tokyo, Japan, is a music conservatory founded in 1929.

After World War II, the music school expanded, becoming the Musashino College of Music. It now has educational sites in Nerima, Iruma, Saitama, and Tama, Tokyo.

Concert halls
Musashino Academia Musicae owns four music halls:
 Beethoven Hall
 Bach Saal
 Mozart Hall
 Schubert Hall

Notable faculty
Kálmán Berkes (clarinet and conductor)
Roger Bobo (tuba)

Graduates
Makoto Nakura (marimba)
Toshiro Ohmi, Japanese popular singer, TV personality
Saori Kobayashi, Japanese video game composer

References

External links
 

Universities and colleges in Tokyo
Music schools in Japan
Nerima
1929 establishments in Japan
Educational institutions established in 1929